Wordsworth Editions is a British publisher known for their low-cost editions of classic literature and non-fiction works.

The firm was founded by Michael Trayler in 1987. The firm began to sell paperbacks at £1 in 1992. The firm has approximately 500 titles in print. The firm is family-owned and based in Ware, Hertfordshire, England.

References

External links 
Official website.

Publishing companies established in 1987
1987 establishments in England
Publishing companies of the United Kingdom
Companies based in East Hertfordshire District